Football is the popular sport, both in terms of participants and spectators, in São Paulo. São Paulo has several of Brazil's significant football clubs, and the city is home to many football clubs.

History

Clubs 
There are many successful football clubs in São Paulo.

Honours 
 Brazil football champion
 SE Palmeiras: (10)
 SC Corinthians: (7)
 São Paulo FC: (6)

São Paulo derby 
 Corinthians (São Paulo) vs. Palmeiras (São Paulo) The Derby Paulista
Corinthians (São Paulo) vs. São Paulo (São Paulo) The Majestic (Majestoso)
 Palmeiras (São Paulo) vs.  São Paulo (São Paulo) The King Strike (Choque-Rei)

Stadia 
 Pacaembu Stadium: Hosted the 1950 FIFA World Cup Opening Match
 Arena Corinthians: Hosted the 2014 FIFA World Cup Opening Match
 Allianz Parque 
 Morumbi Stadium

See also
Football in Brazil
Football in Rio de Janeiro

References